Józef Piłsudski Monument in Warsaw can refer to:
 Józef Piłsudski Monument in Warsaw (Piłsudski Square)
 Józef Piłsudski Monument in Warsaw (Belweder)
 Józef Piłsudski Monument in Warsaw (AWF)